Events in the year 1915 in China.

Incumbents
President: Yuan Shikai
Vice President: Feng Guozhang
Premier: Xu Shichang (until December 22), Lou Tseng-Tsiang (starting December 22)

Events
January 8 — Imperial Japanese government issues the Twenty-One Demands to the Chinese
May 15–21 – The Far Eastern Championship Games take place in Shanghai.
May 25
 Treaty of Kyakhta (1915)
 the Yuan government accepts four out of the five set of demands issued in the Twenty-One Demands 
December 12 — Empire of China (1915–1916)
December 25 — beginning of the National Protection War

Births
 Nien Cheng or Zheng Nian (January 28, 1915 – November 2, 2009) is the pen name of Yao Nien-Yuan[1]. She was a Chinese author who recounted her harrowing experiences during the Cultural Revolution in her memoir Life and Death in Shanghai
 Peter Zhang Bairen (February 14, 1915 – October 12, 2005) was the unofficial Bishop of Hanyang, China
 Yang Huimin (March 6, 1915 - March 9, 1992) was a Girl Guide during the 1937 Battle of Shanghai who supplied a Republic of China flag and brought supplies to besieged defenders of the Sihang Warehouse
Wang Daohan, (27 March 1915 – 24 December 2005) was the former president of the Association for Relations Across the Taiwan Straits (ARATS)
 Sylvia Wu (24 October 1915 – 29 September 2022) was a Chinese-born American restauranteur
 Hu Yaobang (20 November 1915 – 15 April 1989) was a high-ranking official of the People's Republic of China
 Wu Teh Yao (1915–17 April 1994) was an educator and a specialist in Confucianism and political science

Other countries
 Israel Epstein (20 April 1915 – 26 May 2005) was a naturalized Chinese journalist and author. He was one of the few foreign-born Chinese citizens of non-Chinese origin to become a member of the Chinese Communist Party
 Sidney Shapiro (December 23, 1915 – October 18, 2014) was an American-born Chinese translator, actor and author who lived in China from 1947 to 2014. He was one of very few naturalized citizens of the PRC

References

 

 
1910s in China
Years of the 20th century in China